Strictly Personal is the third album by The Romantics. It was released in 1981 on Nemperor Records.

Track listing 
All tracks written by Jimmy Marinos, Coz Canler and Wally Palmar, except where noted.

Personnel
 Coz Canler - lead guitar, backing vocals
 Wally Palmar - rhythm guitar, lead vocals
 Richard Cole - bass
 Jimmy Marinos - drums, vocals

References

1981 albums
The Romantics albums